Dionysios Pyrrhos the Thessalian (Greek: Διονύσιος Πύρρος ο Θετταλός; 1774 or 1777, Kastania, Trikala – 12 February 1853, Athens), was a monk, doctor, writer and publisher.

Biography 
Dionysios Pyrrhos was a monk from Thessaly. He studied in Tyrnavos and Kydonies under  and Benjamin of Lesbos. He then studied medicine in Italy, and when he returned he taught philosophy and sciences in Athens. After the Greek War of Independence he returned to Athens again devoting himself to writing and practicing medicine. Apart from writing he also created maps and earth and celestial sphere globes. He also attempted to create a paper mill, but he failed. He set up a lithography place in Athens. He estimated the amount of the books he had printed to be about 25,000 volumes, covering a range of subjects: medicine, geography, history, morality, grammar. He died on 13 February 1853.

References

Sources 
 Yanis Kordatos, History of Modern Greece, Volume 12.
 , "Dionysios Pyrrhos", in: K. Th. Dimaras, Composite I From education to literature, (edit. Alexis Politis), Seminary of New Hellenism, Athens, 2000, pp. 154–155

1774 births
People from Trikala (regional unit)
1853 deaths
People of the Modern Greek Enlightenment
Greek people of the Greek War of Independence
Greek Christian monks
Archimandrites
19th-century Greek educators
19th-century Greek physicians
Greek publishers (people)
Greek mathematicians
19th-century Greek philosophers
Greek cartographers
19th-century Greek historians
Medical educators
University of Pavia alumni
19th-century Greek scientists
18th-century Greek scientists
18th-century Greek educators